Kadavukaludey ouru
Kadavathur is a village near Thalassery, situated in Kannur district of Kerala state.

Etymology

Kadavu in Malayalam means the bank of a river where there is no bridge and people use country boat to cross the river.

Transportation
The national highway passes through Thalassery town.  Goa and Mumbai can be accessed on the northern side and Cochin and Thiruvananthapuram can be accessed on the southern side.  The road to the east of Iritty connects to Mysore and Bangalore. The nearest railway station is Thalassery on Mangalore-Palakkad line. 
Trains are available to almost all parts of India subject to advance booking over the internet.  There are airports at Mangalore, Kannur and Calicut. All of them are international airports but direct flights are available only to Middle Eastern countries.

References

Villages near Thalassery